Marrok may refer to:

 Sir Marrok, one of the lesser-known Knights of the Round Table
 The main villain of the 14th century poem Sir Tryamour
 A touring member of the Austrian band Harakiri for the Sky
 A Thoroughbred horse, winner of the 1999 Wellington Guineas
 The Marrok is the title of Bran Cornick from the novel series “Mercedes Thompson”.